Sokolac is also the name of a city in Bosnia and Herzegovina

Sokolac is a village in Serbia. It is situated in the Ljubovija municipality, in the Mačva District of Central Serbia. The village had a Serb ethnic majority and a population of 104 in 2002.

Historical population

1948: 295
1953: 305
1961: 274
1971: 211
1981: 156
1991: 118
2002: 104

References

See also
List of places in Serbia

Populated places in Mačva District
Ljubovija